John Budd (16 March 1899 – 16 March 1952) was a British water polo player. He competed at the 1924 Summer Olympics and the 1928 Summer Olympics.

References

External links
 

1899 births
1952 deaths
British male water polo players
Olympic water polo players of Great Britain
Water polo players at the 1924 Summer Olympics
Water polo players at the 1928 Summer Olympics
People from Fulham